The Windsor Wild were an ice hockey team based in Windsor, Quebec that played in the Ligue Nord-Américaine de Hockey (LNAH). Formerly the Sherbrooke Saint-François, the Wild played in the LNAH during the 2011-12 season. They moved to Cornwall, Ontario following the season.

References

External links
Team profile at Eliteprospects

Ice hockey teams in Quebec
Defunct Ligue Nord-Américaine de Hockey teams
Windsor, Quebec